Olufunke Ayotunde Akindele-Bello  (born 24 August 1977) popularly known as Funke Akindele or Jenifa, is a Nigerian filmmaker, director, actress, politician and producer. Akindele starred in the sitcom I Need to Know from 1998 to 2002, and in 2009, she won the Africa Movie Academy Award for Best Actress in a Leading Role. She rose to fame for her role in the movie titled Jenifa which earned her the nickname Jenifa. The Omo Ghetto trilogy contributed to her fame. Funke Akindele played the lead role in the show Jenifa's Diary, for which she was named the Best Actress in a Comedy at the 2016 Africa Magic Viewers Choice Awards. Again, at the 2020 and 2022 AMVCA, she took home the same award, making it her third win for the Best Actress in a Comedy category. Funke Akindele is the most nominated actress at the AMVCA and currently owns seven AMVCA which makes her the actress with most win at the AMVCA. Funke is second director to gross over a billion at the box office with movies like Your Excellency, Omo Ghetto: The Saga and most recent Battle on Buka Street. Funke is the only Yoruba actress to have won an African Movie Academy Award and Africa Magic Viewers Choice Award. Funke Akindele's career continues to soar despite the media's backlash, she doesn't look like she is stopping anytime soon.

In 2022, she was nominated by the People's Democratic Party gubernatorial candidate, Abdul-Azeez Olajide Adediran, as the running mate for the 2023 Lagos state governorship election.

Early life and education 
Akindele was born on 24 August 1977, in Ikorodu, Lagos State, Nigeria.  She is the second of three children (two girls and one boy). Her mother is a medical doctor while her father is a retired school principal. She attended Grace Children's School, Gbagada, Lagos State. She obtained an Ordinary National Diploma (OND) in Mass Communication from the former Ogun State Polytechnic, now known as Moshood Abiola Polytechnic. She earned a Law degree from the University of Lagos.

Career 
Akindele came into the limelight after starring in the popular United Nations Population Fund (UNFPA)-sponsored sitcom I Need to Know, which ran from 1998 to 2002. Funke Akindele played Bisi, a curious but highly intelligent secondary school student. Funke Akindele's big break came in 2008 when she appeared in the movie Jenifa.

In January 2018, there was a controversy when it was reported that Funke Akindele would get her Hollywood debut in Marvel's Avengers: Infinity War as she was listed as a member of the cast on IMDb. Mainstream Nigerian press reported that Jenifa was set to star in Infinity War as the guard Dora Milaje, citing IMDb. Some weeks later her name was replaced with that of fellow Nigerian actress Genevieve Nnaji, with Funke Akindele's upload shown to have been a hack. In February 2018, it was reported that Senate President and chair of the National Assembly, Dr. Bukola Saraki , had advised Marvel Studios to feature Akindele in Infinity War.

In an interview on July 2016,  Funke Akindele stated she was acting less in the Yoruba film industry at that time because of piracy. Akindele plays the lead character in the ongoing hit TV show Jenifa's Diary, alongside Fisayo Ajisola, Falz, Juliana Olayode, and Aderounmu Adejumoke. The show is a spin-off from the movie Jenifa. The 2018 comedy film Moms at War stars Funke Akindele and Omoni Oboli. In July 2019, Akindele started a new web series, Aiyetoro Town, a spinoff from her popular TV series, Jenifa’s Diary. She is the CEO of Scene One Film Production.

She made her directorial debut in the 2019 political drama film, Your Excellency.

Political career 
Akindele was nominated as the Lagos deputy governorship candidate under Peoples Democratic Party (Nigeria) in the upcoming 2023 elections. In justifying her nomination, Abdul-Azeez Olajide Adediran, popularly known as Jandor, noted that the actress will add more value to his candidacy in the 2023 general elections. Confirming her deputy governorship candidacy on Tuesday, the actress stated that her acting career must be “necessarily put on hold”.

Charity initiative 
Akindele runs a non-governmental organization known as the Jenifa Foundation, which aims at providing young people with vocational skills.

Endorsements 
Akindele has endorsement deals such as her being signed as an Ambassador to Dettol and Irokotv. In 2018, she was signed as a brand ambassador for Keystone Bank. In November 2019, she signed an endorsement deal with WAW Nigeria, a company that manufactures detergent and bar soap.

Personal life 
On 26 May 2012, Funke Akindele married Adeola Kehinde Oloyede. The couple divorced in July 2013, citing irreconcilable differences. Funke Akindele married Nigerian rapper JJC Skillz in London in May 2016. Her pregnancy rumours were among the top searched results on Google search engine in August 2017.
JJC Skillz announced the end of the union between him and the popular actress which lasted six years via his official Instagram handle on June 30,2022.

 Funke Akindele gave birth to twin boys in December 2018 and has several step-children.

Controversy 

In April 2020, Akindele was arrested along with her husband and charged to court for hosting a birthday party in honour of her husband during the period of an imposed lockdown (to tackle coronavirus). She later appeared in a Nigeria Centre for Disease Control video to raise awareness about coronavirus. The actress and her husband were sentenced to a 14-day community service after pleading guilty to violating the lockdown order.

Record holdings 

Her movie Omo Ghetto currently holds the record of becoming the highest-grossing movie of all time in Nigeria, breaking the four-year record of Kemi Adetiba's movie titled 'The Wedding Party'.

According to a statement, broadcast by the Cinema Exhibitors Association of Nigeria (CEAN), in January 2021, the movie grossed N468,036,300 after maintaining its number one spot for 3 consecutive weeks. Funke has the most win at award shows like AmVca and NEA Awards.

She is the producer and director of two highest grossing Nollywood movies of all time. Omoghetto is fourth highest grossing film in west Africa while battle on buka street is the fifth highest grossing Nollywood film in the region

Filmography 
The films of Funke Akindele are listed in alphabetical order:

Agbefo
Aje Metta
Akandun
Anointed Liars
Apaadi
Apoti Orogun
Atanpako Meta
Battle on Buka Street
Baye se Nlo
Bolode O'ku
Chief Daddy
Dwindle
Edunjobi
Egun
Emi Abata
Farayola
Ija Ola
Industreet
Isoken
Jenifa
Jenifa's Diary
Kakaki 'leku
Kòséfowórà
Ladies Gang
Love Wahala
Maami
Maku
Married but Living Single
Moms at War
Oba Irawo
Odun Baku
Okun Ife Yi
Omo Ghetto
Omo Ghetto: The Saga
Omo Pupa
Oreke Mulero
Osuwon Edaf
Return of Jenifa
My Siblings and I
A Trip to Jamaica
Taiwo Taiwo
Chief Daddy 2: Going for Broke
Your Excellency
Who's the Boss (2020 film)
 Far From Home (2022 series)

Awards and nominations

See also
 List of Yoruba people
 List of Nigerian actresses

References

External links
 
 https://twitter.com/funkeakindele
 https://www.bbc.com/pidgin/tori-54481696

Best Actress Africa Movie Academy Award winners
1977 births
Actresses from Lagos State
Yoruba actresses
Living people
University of Lagos alumni
21st-century Nigerian actresses
Nigerian film actresses
Nigerian television actresses
Participants in Nigerian reality television series
Actresses in Yoruba cinema
Moshood Abiola Polytechnic alumni
Nigerian film producers
Nigerian politicians
Nigerian film directors
Nigerian actor-politicians
Nigerian film award winners
Nigerian media personalities
Nigerian television personalities
Women in Lagos politics
21st-century Nigerian politicians